The 1889 Dartmouth football team represented Dartmouth College as a member of the Eastern Intercollegiate Football Association (EIFA) during the 1889 college football season. Dartmouth compiled an overall record of 7–1 with a mark of 4–0 in EIFA play, winning the league title.

Schedule

References

Dartmouth
Dartmouth Big Green football seasons
Dartmouth football